
Woolmer is a locality in East Hampshire, in South East England, the main feature of which is Woolmer Forest. 

The name Woolmer (or Woolmers) may also refer to:

Places

Australia 

 Woolmer, Queensland, a locality in the Toowoomba Region

 Woolmers Estate, a farming estate located in Longford, Tasmania

United Kingdom 

Woolmer Green, a small village and civil parish in Hertfordshire, England
Woolmer Hill, an area of high ground in the Borough of Waverley, in Surrey, England
Woolmers Park, a Grade II* listed building in Hertfordshire, England

Institutions
 Woolmer Hill School, the main secondary school in the area of Haslemere, Surrey

People
 Alfred Woolmer (1805–1892), English painter
 Bob Woolmer (1948–2007), English cricketer
 Caroline Woolmer Leakey (1827–1881), English writer who lived five years in Van Diemen's Land (now Tasmania)
 Clarence Woolmer (1910–1999), English cricketer
 Kenneth Woolmer, Baron Woolmer of Leeds (born 1940), British university lecturer and politician
 Laurence Woolmer (1906–1977), Bishop of Lahore, 1949-68
 Luke Woolmer (born 1965), Australian politician
 Ronald Woolmer, to whom the Woolmer Lecture is dedicated
 Tony Woolmer (born 1946), English footballer

See also
Wooler